John B. Wooten (born December 5, 1936) is a former American football guard who played nine professional seasons in the National Football League (NFL) for the Cleveland Browns and Washington Redskins.  Wooten played college football at the University of Colorado and was drafted in the fifth round of the 1959 NFL Draft.

Early life
Wooten was born in Riverview, Texas.  His family then moved to Carlsbad, New Mexico and he attended segregated schools through the 9th grade, before attending the newly-integrated Carlsbad High School.   Wooten first played high school football as a sophomore in 1952, and he eventually earned All-State honors in football and basketball.  He received offers to play football at Dartmouth College, Florida A&M University, UCLA, the University of New Mexico and New Mexico State University, but chose to go to the University of Colorado at Boulder instead.

College career
Wooten attended and played college football at the University of Colorado at Boulder.  He joined the team in 1955 and became the second African-American varsity football player in the program's history (Franklin Clarke was the first).  As a senior, Wooten earned American Football Coaches Association All-America honors and was selected to play in the Chicago College All-Star Game.  He is believed to be one of the first African-Americans to earn All-America honors playing a position in the interior line.  He graduated in 1959 with a Bachelor of Science degree in Education.

Honors
Wooten was inducted into the College Football Hall of Fame in 2012.  He was also selected as one of 25 members of Colorado's All-Century Team in 1989, honoring the school’s first 100 years of intercollegiate football.

Professional career

Cleveland Browns
Wooten was drafted in the fifth round (53rd overall) of the 1959 NFL Draft by the Cleveland Browns, where he would play left guard for the next nine seasons.  During that time, he blocked for Hall of Fame running back Jim Brown, widely regarded as one of the top running backs in NFL history.  Brown led the league in rushing for six of the seven seasons Wooten served as one of his blockers, and was the NFL Most Valuable Player in 1965 with 1,544 yards and a league-best 21 touchdowns.  The Browns defeated the Baltimore Colts, 27–0, to win the 1964 NFL Championship Game.  They also played in the 1965 NFL Championship Game and lost to the Green Bay Packers, 23–12.   In 1979, he was named to the Browns All-Time All-Star Team.  In 2010, Wooten was inducted into the Browns Ring of Honor, as well as the Browns Legends program.

Washington Redskins
In July 1968, Wooten demanded a trade from the Browns after a dispute with the organization involving an all-white Browns' golf outing in Ashland, Ohio. On July 19, 1968, he was released from the Browns by owner Art Modell. The Washington Redskins signed Wooten in August, and he played his final year with them.

Front office
After retiring from football, Wooten worked for a short time as a sports agent at Pro Sports Advisors from 1973 to 1975. He then became a scout with the Dallas Cowboys from 1975 to 1979. He was promoted to Director of Pro Personnel in 1980. In 1992, he moved to the role of Player Personnel with the Philadelphia Eagles. He was promoted to Vice President of Player Personnel in 1994. In 1998, he moved to the Baltimore Ravens Assistant Director of Pro and College Scouting. In 2000, he began to prepare for his eventual retirement, taking a step back to work as a consultant with the Ravens until 2003.

Currently he is a "Football GM & Scouting" instructor for the online sports-career training school Sports Management Worldwide, founded and run by Dr. Lynn Lashbrook.

Fritz Pollard Alliance
In 2003, Wooten became the Chairman of the Fritz Pollard Alliance, an advocacy group who works in conjunction with the National Football League as it relates to minority hiring in coaching, scouting and front office positions.

Personal life
Wooten is a resident of Arlington, Texas, where he lives with his wife.  They have five children and five grandchildren.

References

External links
 
 

1936 births
Living people
American football offensive guards
Baltimore Ravens executives
Baltimore Ravens scouts
Cleveland Browns players
Colorado Buffaloes football players
Dallas Cowboys executives
Dallas Cowboys scouts
Philadelphia Eagles executives
Washington Redskins players
College Football Hall of Fame inductees
Eastern Conference Pro Bowl players
People from Carlsbad, New Mexico
Players of American football from New Mexico
African-American players of American football
20th-century African-American sportspeople
21st-century African-American sportspeople